The Judicial Pensions and Retirement Act 1993 is an Act of the Parliament of the United Kingdom that strengthened the mandatory retirement provisions previously instituted by the Judicial Pensions Act 1959 for members of the British judiciary.

While the 1959 Act forbade service past age 75 by any judges appointed thereafter (Lord Denning being the last exempt jurist in England retiring in 1982 and John Cameron, Lord Cameron in Scotland, retired 1985), the 1993 Act made the ordinary retirement age 70, and while enabling a minister (presumably the Lord Chancellor) to allow individual judges to remain in office until 75, it expressly forbids persons aged over 75 to hold any judicial post whatsoever. An exception is the post of Lord Chancellor, a political appointee (although the role is no longer judicial).

References

External links

United Kingdom Acts of Parliament 1993
Pensions in the United Kingdom
Judiciaries of the United Kingdom